The Maryland Center for Fundamental Physics (MCFP) is a research institute at the University of Maryland, College Park focused on theoretical physics.

About 
The MCFP was founded in 2007 and is currently directed by Raman Sundrum. It is a subdivision of the Department of Physics as well as the College of Computer, Mathematical, and Natural Sciences at the University of Maryland. It houses research in theoretical elementary particle physics, gravitation, and quarks.

Members 
Members currently include 13 full-time faculty, as well as many postdocs, graduate students, and visitors. Present and past faculty include:

 Alessandra Buonanno, gravitational wave physicist
 Sylvester James Gates, string theorist, recipient of National Medal of Science
 Oscar Greenberg, known for color charge
 Ted Jacobson, gravitational physicist
 Xiangdong Ji, former director of MCTP, nuclear physicist, recipient of Herman Feshbach Prize
 Charles Misner, known for his book on gravitation, recipient of Dannie Heineman Prize for Mathematical Physics
 Rabindra Mohapatra, theoretical particle physicist
 Jogesh Pati, particle physicist, recipient of Dirac Medal
 Raman Sundrum, director, known for Randall-Sundrum models
 Aron Wall, winner of 2019 New Horizons Prize in physics.

See also
 Center for Theoretical Physics (disambiguation)

References

External links 
 

Theoretical physics institutes
University of Maryland, College Park
Physics institutes